The 2016 Mediterranean Athletics U23 Championships was an athletics competition which was held in Tunis (Stadium in Radès), Tunisia, from 4 to 5 June 2016. A total of 42 events were contested, of which 21 were contested by male and 21 by female athletes. A total of 27 nations participated in the championships.

Medal summary

Men

Women

Medal table
 Host

References

External links
U23 Mediterranean Championships

Mediterranean Athletics U23 Championships
Mediterranean Athletics U23 Championships
Mediterranean Athletics U23 Championships
International athletics competitions hosted by France
June 2016 sports events in Europe